Sierentz (Alsatian: Siarez) is a commune in the Haut-Rhin department in Alsace in north-eastern France. It is located roughly halfway between Mulhouse and Basel.  Both cities can be accessed by train from Sierentz station.

See also
 Communes of the Haut-Rhin department

References

External links

Official site

Communes of Haut-Rhin